Downtown Asheville Historic District is a national historic district located at Asheville, Buncombe County, North Carolina.  The district encompasses about 279 contributing buildings and one contributing object in the central business district of Asheville. It includes commercial, institutional, and residential buildings in a variety of popular architectural styles including Colonial Revival, Queen Anne, and Art Deco.

Located in the district and listed separately are the Asheville City Hall, Asheville Transfer and Storage Company Building, B&B Motor Company Building, Bledsoe Building, Buncombe County Courthouse, Thomas Wolfe House, Young Men's Institute Building, Ravenscroft School, Church of St. Lawrence, Battery Park Hotel, S & W Cafeteria, Sawyer Motor Company Building and the Arcade Building. Other notable buildings include the Flatiron Building (1927), Drhumor Building (1895), Sondley Building (1891), Grand Central Hotel Annex (c. 1886), Public Service Building (1929), Kress Building (1926-1927), Mount Zion Missionary Baptist Church (1919), First Church of Christ Scientist (1900-1912), U. S. Post Office and Courthouse (1929-1930), Asheville Citizen and Times Building (1938-1939), Former Bon Marche Department Store (1923), Castanea Building (1921), Loughran Building (1923), Central Methodist Church (1902-1905, 1924, 1968), Trinity Episcopal Church (1912), First Presbyterian Church (1884-1885), Eagles Home (1914), Scottish Rite Cathedral and Masonic Temple (1913), and the Jackson Building (1923-1924). Also in the district is Pack Square.

It was listed on the National Register of Historic Places in 1979, with boundary increases in 1989 and 1990.  An increase / decrease occurred in 2011.

Gallery

References

External links

Historic districts on the National Register of Historic Places in North Carolina
Queen Anne architecture in North Carolina
Colonial Revival architecture in North Carolina
Buildings and structures in Asheville, North Carolina
National Register of Historic Places in Buncombe County, North Carolina